was the 52nd emperor of Japan, according to the traditional order of succession. Saga's reign spanned the years from 809 through 823.

Traditional narrative
Saga was the second son of Emperor Kanmu and Fujiwara no Otomuro. Saga was an "accomplished calligrapher" able to compose in Chinese who held the first imperial poetry competitions. According to legend, he was the first Japanese emperor to drink tea.

Saga is traditionally venerated at his tomb; the Imperial Household Agency designates , in Ukyō-ku, Kyoto, as the location of Saga's mausoleum.

Events of Saga's life
 806 Saga became the crown prince at age 21.
 June 17, 809: In the 4th year of Emperor Heizei's reign, he fell ill and abdicated; and the succession (senso) was received by Kanmu's second son Saga, the eldest son having become a Buddhist priest.  Shortly thereafter, Emperor Saga is said to have acceded to the throne (sokui).

Soon after his enthronement, Saga himself took ill. At the time the retired Heizei had quarreled with his brother over the ideal location of the court, the latter preferring the Heian capital, while the former was convinced that a shift back to the Nara plain was necessary, and Heizei, exploiting Saga's weakened health, seized the opportunity to foment a rebellion, known historically as the Kusuko Incident; however, forces loyal to Emperor Saga, led by taishōgun Sakanoue no Tamuramaro, quickly defeated the Heizei rebels which thus limited the adverse consequences which would have followed any broader conflict.  This same Tamuramaro is remembered in Aomori's annual Nebuta Matsuri which feature a number of gigantic, specially-constructed, illuminated paper floats.  These great lantern-structures are colorfully painted with mythical figures; and teams of men carry them through the streets as crowds shout encouragement.  This early ninth century military leader is commemorated in this way because he is said to have ordered huge illuminated lanterns to be placed at the top of hills; and when the curious Emishi approached these bright lights to investigate, they were captured and subdued by Tamuramaro's men.
 August 24, 842: Saga died at the age of 57.

Eras of Saga's reign
The years of Saga's reign are more specifically identified by more than one era name (nengō).
 Daidō             (806–810)
 Kōnin (810–824)

Legacy
In ancient Japan, there were four noble clans, the Gempeitōkitsu (源平藤橘).  One of these clans, the Minamoto clan are also known as Genji (源氏), and of these, the Saga Genji (嵯峨源氏) are descended from 52nd emperor Saga.  Saga's son, Minamoto no Tōru, is thought to be an inspiration for the protagonist of the novel The Tale of Genji.

Emperor Saga played an important role as a stalwart supporter of the Buddhist monk Kūkai.  The emperor helped Kūkai to establish the Shingon School of Buddhism by granting him Tō-ji Temple in the capital Heian-kyō (present-day Kyoto).

Daikaku-ji 
 is a Shingon Buddhist temple in Ukyō-ku in Kyoto. The site was originally a residence of the emperor, and later various emperor conducted their cloistered rule from here. The artificial lake of the temple, Ōsawa Pond, is one of the oldest Japanese garden ponds to survive from the Heian period.

The Saga Go-ryū school of ikebana has its headquarters in the temple and is named in his honour.

Kugyō
 is a collective term for the very few most powerful men attached to the court of the Emperor of Japan in pre-Meiji eras.

In general, this elite group included only three to four men at a time.  These were hereditary courtiers whose experience and background would have brought them to the pinnacle of a life's career.  During Saga's reign (809–823), this kugyō included:
 Sadaijin
 Udaijin, Fujiwara no Uchimaro (藤原内麿), 806–812.
 Udaijin, Fujiwara no Sonohito (藤原園人), 812–818.
 Udaijin, Fujiwara no Fuyutsugu (藤原冬嗣), 821–825.
 Udaijin, Tachibana no Ujikimi.
 Naidaijin
 Dainagon

Consorts and children

Saga had 49 children with at least 30 different women. Many of the children received the surname Minamoto, thereby removing them from royal succession.

Second Son: Imperial Prince Masara (正良親王) later Emperor Ninmyō
Imperial Princess Seishi (正子内親王; 810–879), married to Emperor Junna
Imperial Princess Hideko (秀子内親王; d. 850)
Imperial Prince Hidera (秀良親王; 817–895)
Imperial Princess Toshiko (俊子内親王; d. 826)
Fifth Daughter: Imperial Princess Yoshiko (芳子内親王; d. 836)
Imperial Princess Shigeko (繁子内親王; d. 865)

Hi (deposed): Imperial Princess Takatsu (高津内親王; d. 841), Emperor Kanmu’s daughter
Second Prince: Imperial Prince Nariyoshi (業良親王; d. 868)
Imperial Princess Nariko (業子内親王; d. 815)

Hi: Tajihi no Takako (多治比高子; 787–825), Tajihi no Ujimori's daughter

Bunin: Fujiwara no Onatsu (藤原緒夏; d. 855), Fujiwara no Uchimaro's daughter

Court lady (Naishi-no-kami): Kudara no Kyomyō (百済王慶命; d. 849), Kudara no Kyōshun's daughter
Minamoto no Yoshihime (源善姫; b. 814)
Minamoto no Sadamu (源定; 815–863)
Minamoto no Wakahime (源若姫)
Minamoto no Shizumu (源鎮; 824–881)

Nyōgo: Kudara no Kimyō (百済貴命; d. 851), Kudara no Shuntetsu's daughter
Imperial Prince Motora (基良親王; d. 831)
Fourth Son: Imperial Prince Tadara (忠良親王; 819–876)
Imperial Princess Motoko (基子内親王; d. 831)

Nyōgo: Ōhara no Kiyoko (大原浄子; d. 841), Ōhara no Ietsugu's daughter
Tenth Daughter: Imperial Princess Ninshi (仁子内親王; d. 889), 15th Saiō in Ise Shrine 809–823

Koui: Iidaka no Yakatoji (飯高宅刀自), Iidaka Gakuashi
Minamoto no Tokiwa (源常; 812–854)
Minamoto no Akira (源明; 814–852/853)

Koui: Akishino no Koko (秋篠高子/康子), Akishino no Yasuhito's daughter
Minamoto no Kiyoshi (源清)

Koui: Yamada no Chikako (山田近子)
Minamoto no Hiraku(?) (源啓; 829–869)
Minamoto no Mituhime (源密姫)

Nyōgo: Princess Katano (交野女王), Prince Yamaguchi's daughter
Eighth Daughter: Imperial Princess Uchiko (有智子内親王; 807–847), 1st Saiin in Kamo Shrine 810–831

Court lady: Takashina no Kawako (高階河子), Takashina no Kiyoshina's daughter
Imperial Princess Sōshi (宗子内親王; d. 854)

Court lady: Hiroi no Otona's daughter
Seventh Son: Minamoto no Makoto (源信)

Court lady: Fuse no Musashiko (布勢武蔵子)
Minamoto no Sadahime (源貞姫; 810–880)
Minamoto no Hashihime (源端姫)

Court lady: Kamitsukeno clan’s daughter
Minamoto no Hiromu (源弘; 812–863)

Court lady: Abe no Yanatsu's daughter
Minamoto no Yutaka (源寛; 813–876)

Court lady: Kasa no Tsugiko (笠継子), Kasa no Nakamori's daughter
Minamoto no Ikeru (源生; 821–872)

Court lady: Awata clan's daughter
Minamoto no Yasushi (源安; 822–853)

Court lady: Ōhara no Matako (大原全子), Ōhara no Mamuro's daughter
Minamoto no Tōru (源融), Sadaijin
Minamoto no Tsutomu (源勤; 824–881)
Minamoto no Mitsuhime (源盈姫)

Court lady: Ki clan's daughter
Minamoto no Sarahime (源更姫)

Court lady: Kura no Kageko (内蔵影子)
Minamoto no Kamihime (源神姫)
Minamoto no Katahime (源容姫)
Minamoto no Agahime (源吾姫)

Court lady: Kannabi no Iseko (甘南備伊勢子)
Minamoto no Koehime (源声姫)

Court lady: Fun'ya no Fumiko (文屋文子), Fun'ya no Kugamaro's daughter
 Imperial Princess Junshi (純子内親王; d. 863)
 Imperial Princess Seishi (斉子内親王; d. 853), married to Prince Fujii (son of Emperor Kanmu)
 Prince Atsushi (淳王)

Court lady: Tanaka clan's daughter
Minamoto no Sumu(?) (源澄)

Court lady: Koreyoshi no Sadamichi's daughter
Minamoto no Masaru (源勝)

Court lady: Ōnakatomi no Mineko (大中臣峯子)

Court lady: Tachibana no Haruko (橘春子)

Court lady: Nagaoka no Okanari's daughter
Minamoto no Sakashi(?) (源賢)

Court lady (Nyoju): Taima no Osadamaro's daughter
 Minamoto no Kiyohime (源潔姫; 810–856), married to Fujiwara no Yoshifusa
Minamoto no Matahime (源全姫; 812–882), Naishi-no-kami (尚侍)

Lady-in-waiting: Sugawara Kanshi (菅原閑子)

(from unknown women)
Minamoto no Tsugu (?) (源継)
Minamoto no Yoshihime (源良姫)
Minamoto no Toshihime (源年姫)

Ancestry

See also
Emperor Go-Saga
Imperial cult

Notes

References
 
嵯峨山上

External links 
 Another photo of Emperor Saga's mausoleum

 
 

Japanese emperors
9th-century Japanese calligraphers
786 births
842 deaths
9th-century rulers in Asia
8th-century Japanese people
9th-century Japanese monarchs
Japanese retired emperors